Mohamed Al-Junaibi (Arabic:محمد الجنيبي) (born 29 May 1998) is an Emirati professional footballer who plays as a winger for UAE Pro League club Al Dhafra.

Career

Al-Wahda
Al-Junaibi started his career at Al-Wahda and is a product of the Al-Wahda's youth system. On 29 April 2019, Al-Junaibi made his professional debut for Al-Wahda against Al-Fujairah in the Pro League, replacing Tahnoon Al-Zaabi .

Al Dhafra
On 11 July 2020 left Al-Wahda and signed with Al-Dhafra.

References

External links
 

1998 births
Living people
Emirati footballers
Al Wahda FC players
Al Dhafra FC players
UAE Pro League players
Association football wingers
Place of birth missing (living people)